Paul Delecroix (born 14 October 1988) is a French professional footballer who plays as a goalkeeper for Championnat National club Châteauroux.

Career
Born in Amiens, Delecroix started his career with Amiens and made six league appearances for the club. He spent the 2011–12 season with Championnat National side Niort and played in every league game as the team won promotion to Ligue 2 as runners-up in the National. He subsequently joined Niort permanently on 27 June 2012, signing a two-year contract with the newly promoted club.

In May 2016, it was announced Delecroix would join FC Lorient on a three-year contract.

In July 2018, Delecroix joined FC Metz after being freed from his Lorient contract.

In January 2021, Delecroix signed for Championnat National club Annecy.

Personal life 
Paul's father Jean-Louis is a former footballer.

Career statistics

Honours 
Metz

 Ligue 2: 2018–19

Metz B

 Championnat National 3: 2019–20

References

External links

Paul Delecroix profile at FootNational

1988 births
Living people
Sportspeople from Amiens
French footballers
Association football goalkeepers
Amiens SC players
Chamois Niortais F.C. players
FC Lorient players
FC Metz players
FC Annecy players
LB Châteauroux players
Ligue 1 players
Ligue 2 players
Championnat National players
Championnat National 2 players
Championnat National 3 players
Footballers from Hauts-de-France